Emperor Gong of Sui may refer to two rulers at the end of the Sui dynasty:

Yang You (605–619, reigned 617–618), puppet emperor installed by the rebel Li Yuan (future Emperor Gaozu of Tang)
Yang Tong (604–619, reigned 618–619), puppet emperor dominated by the rebel Wang Shichong